The Swinger is a 1966 American sex comedy film directed by George Sidney and starring Ann-Margret and Anthony Franciosa.

Plot
Kelly Olsson is an aspiring writer, but Girl-Lure magazine keeps rejecting her racy submissions. Kelly decides to show the magazine boys what they are missing. She creates a fake identity for herself, pretending that a story about a young woman's wild ways is actually about herself.

Girl-Lures lecherous editor, Sir Hubert, and his suave editor, Ric Colby, like the concept but aren't sure they trust the facts. Kelly tries to fool them by staging an orgy in her apartment building, asking friendly tenants to go along with her scheme. Sgt. Hooker of the vice squad does not feel she is fooling, however, and places Kelly under arrest.

Ric comes to her rescue. But when her hoax is revealed, he decides to get revenge by insisting that Kelly pose for a provocative layout for the magazine to prove she is as wild as she claims. By the time his car and her motorcycle meet head-on in the end, they're in love.

Cast

Production
George Sidney had previously made Bye Bye Birdie and Viva Las Vegas with Ann Margret. Sidney says the script for Viva Las Vegas had been written in eleven days in order to meet a commitment and The Swinger was similar. "We did the script in ten days," he said. "The studio had a commitment and needed to fulfil it... We devised a script that would give Ann-Margret an opportunity to show her facets. And boom, boom - off we went."

Filming started 13 December 1965 and finished by March 1966 after which Ann-Margret went to Vietnam to entertain the troops.

Sidney called the film "a wild, outrageous 'in', what's-happening-in-the-world-today kind of picture."

Reception
Filmink called it "s a hopelessly confused comedy" which "feels like it was written by someone while drunk and Tony Franciosa is yet another male lead not worthy of the star" arguing "this film, a vehicle geared entirely around Ann-Margret’s talents, came close to killing her Hollywood career more than any other by virtue of its sheer incompetence."

References

External links
 
 
 
 

1966 films
1966 comedy films
1960s English-language films
1960s sex comedy films
American sex comedy films
Films about writers
Films directed by George Sidney
Films scored by Marty Paich
Films shot in Los Angeles
Paramount Pictures films
1960s American films